The Sunshine Coast Cricket Association is a cricket competition and administrative body on Australia's Sunshine Coast.

The competition has been established for over sixty years.

Competition 
The competition is split into 6 divisions, with the 3rd and 4th divisions split into a further two divisions and the 6th division split into regions (north and south). Each division has approximately 8 teams who play each other twice in one two-day match and one one-day match.

Clubs 

 Buderim
 Burpengary
 Caboolture
 Caloundra

 Coolum
 Cooroy-Eumundi
 Glasshouse
 Gympie

 Landsborough
 Maleny
 Maroochydore
 Nambour

 Palmwoods
 Tewantin-Noosa
 Wamuran-Stanley River
 Yandina

References 

Australian domestic cricket competitions
Caloundra
Sport in the Sunshine Coast, Queensland
1946 establishments in Australia